In2ition is the second studio album by Croatian cello duo, 2Cellos. It was released on November 9, 2012 in Japan, and January 15, 2013 in the rest of the world, through Sony Masterworks. The album peaked at number 1 on the Croatian and Japanese Albums charts.

Track listing

Personnel

2Cellos
 Stjepan Hauser and Luka Šulić - cellos

Additional Musicians
 Dušan Kranjc - drums on "Highway To Hell"
 Tom Snider - keyboards on "Benedictus"
 Bob Ezrin - keyboards on "Benedictus"

Musician credits taken directly from liner notes.

Charts 
Weekly charts

Year-end charts

Music videos

Release history

Accolades

Notes

References

External links
In2ition on iTunes

2Cellos albums
2012 albums
Albums produced by Bob Ezrin